Snake Island is a sand island, located in Corner Inlet in the Gippsland region of Victoria, Australia. Snake Island lies within the Nooramunga Marine and Coastal Park and is part of a complex of barrier islands that protect a large marine embayment from the pounding waves of Bass Strait. The Aboriginal Gunai name for the island is Negima.

As the island is remote and relatively unspoilt it is popular for bushwalkers and many tracks crisscross the island.  Care must be taken on the oceanic beaches as they have rapidly changing tides. A diverse range of flora and fauna makes the island particularly interesting for naturalists.

History
Snake Island is part of the traditional territory of the Brataualung clan of the Gunai people, who named it "Negima".  As well as being a place of refuge, it was used as a nuptial island for young couples.  Since the 1880s the island has been used by South Gippsland farmers to agist cattle in winter, swimming their stock over a narrow channel at low tide.

A 53 m long jetty was built using local timbers by soldiers from the 91 Forestry Squadron (Woodpeckers) in September 1982 at the swashway between snake and little snake islands.

Flora and fauna
The vegetation communities of Snake Island include woodland, scrubland, heath, freshwater swamps, mangroves, and salt marsh.

Mammals found on the island include the native eastern grey kangaroo, swamp wallaby, koala, swamp antechinus, as well as the hog deer.  There are many birds present including the eastern ground parrot.  Large numbers of migratory waders roost along the coast after feeding on the inlet's extensive intertidal mudflats.

References

External links
 Snake Island camping 

Islands of Victoria (Australia)
Gippsland (region)